Peter Hugh Brown, C.Ss.R. (born ) is a New Zealand-born prelate who has been serving as the second bishop of the Diocese of Samoa-Pago Pago in American Samoa since 2013.

Biography

Early life 
Peter Brown was born on November 11, 1947, in Greymouth, New Zealand,  the youngest child of William and Mary (Sweeney) Brown.  He attended Marist Brothers primary and secondary schools, then worked in secular jobs.  On February 16, 1969, Brown professed his first vows as a member of the Congregation of the Most Holy Redeemer. After several years in seminary, he professed his perpetual vows to the Redemptorists on October 26, 1975. 

For seven years Brown worked as a religious brother in different communities, then traveled to Samoa to help out at the Redemptorist mission there. He then studied for the priesthood at Yarra Theological Union in Melbourne, Australia.

Priesthood 
Brown was ordained to the priesthood for the Redemptorists by Bishop Brian Ashby on December 19, 1981.  He served as a missionary on Savaii Island, Safotu, then later as a chaplain for migrants in Auckland, New Zealand.  Brown served as a parish priest in Clover Park, South Auckland, before being elected as the Redemptorist's regional superior.  Brown is fluent in the Samoan language.

Bishop of Samoa-Pago Pago 
Pope Francis named Brown the bishop of the Diocese of Samoa-Pago Pago on May 31, 2013.  On August 22, 2013, Brown was installed and consecrated by Archbishop Martin Krebs  The principal co-consecrators were Bishops John Weitzel and Denis Browne.

See also

 Catholic Church hierarchy
 Catholic Church in the United States
 Historical list of the Catholic bishops of the United States
 List of Catholic bishops of the United States
 Lists of patriarchs, archbishops, and bishops

References

External links
 Diocese of Samoa–Pago Pago Website

1947 births
Living people
People from Greymouth
Redemptorist bishops
New Zealand Roman Catholic missionaries
Roman Catholic bishops of Samoa–Pago Pago
21st-century Roman Catholic bishops in Oceania
Roman Catholic missionaries in American Samoa
New Zealand expatriates in American Samoa